The Dominican Republic national under-20 football team is the association football team that represents the Dominican Republic at the under-20 level.

Team history

2022
At the 2022 Concacaf Men’s Under-20 Championship held in Honduras from June 18 to July 3, 2022, the Dominican Republic U20 team made history by clinching berths in the 2023 FIFA Men’s Under-20 World Cup in Indonesia after eliminating Jamaica with a 1-0 win in the quarterfinal. It is the first time any Dominican Republic team has qualified for a FIFA World Cup at any age level or gender. In the semifinal match, the Dominican team defeated Guatemala 4-2 in a penalty shootout after a 2-2, securing a spot in the 2024 Summer Olympic games in Paris.

Competitve record

CONCACAF U-20 Championship

Fixtures and recent results

The following is a list of match results from the previous 12 months, as well as any future matches that have been scheduled.

2022

Current squad
 The following players were called up for the 2022 CONCACAF U-20 Championship.
 Match dates: 18 June – 3 July 2022
 Caps and goals correct as of: 13 November 2021, after match against 
 Names in italics denote players who have been capped for the senior team.

See also
Dominican Republic national football team
Dominican Republic national under-23 football team

References

Dominican Republic national football team
CONCACAF Under-20 Championship squads